Parliamentary elections were held in Cape Verde on 20 March 2016. The ruling African Party for the Independence of Cape Verde (PAICV), led by Janira Hopffer Almada, was defeated by the Movement for Democracy (MpD), led by Ulisses Correia e Silva.

Electoral system
The 72 members of the National Assembly are elected from 16 multi-member constituencies ranging in size from 2 to 15 seats. The elections are held using closed list proportional representation, with seats allocated using the d'Hondt method.

Campaign
A total of 551 candidates ran for election, including 173 women.

Results

List of elected MPs

Reactions
African Union: The African Union team of 20 observers declared that the elections held were fair and conducted in a peaceful and free manner. The AU also commended the government in creating the legal atmosphere for the press to conduct their business freely.

References

2016 elections in Africa
2016 in Cape Verde
2016 1